Heilongjiang Provincial Library is the largest library in Heilongjiang Province, as well as a major provincial library in China. It houses important scientific, cultural and arts literature relating to Northeast China and other national historical records such as ancient Chinese and foreign publications.

History
In 1907, the governor of Heilongjiang General established Heilongjiang Library in Qiqihar, the former capital of Heilongjiang. In 1954, after the merger of Heilongjiang and Songjiang provinces, Harbin was established the new capital of Heilongjiang Province. Therefore Heilongjiang Provincial government prepared for the construction of new Heilongjiang Provincial Library since 1957, and opened for public service in 1962. In 2003, the library moved to a newly built modern building located on the east of Dragon Tower in Nangang District of Harbin.

See also
Libraries in the People's Republic of China
Chinese Library Classification (CLC)
Archives in the People's Republic of China

References

1907 establishments in China
Libraries in Heilongjiang
Buildings and structures in Harbin
Libraries established in 1907